Message to You is the third album by The Soldiers. The album was released on 24 October 2011. On 30 October 2011 entered the UK Albums Chart at number 11. The album includes the single "I've Gotta Get a Message to You".

Singles
 "I've Gotta Get a Message to You" was the first single released from the album, released on 23 October 2010.

Track listing
Standard listing
 "I've Gotta Get a Message to You" (with. Robin Gibb) - 3:19
 "Pipes of Peace" - 3:24
 "Make You Feel My Love" - 3:33	
 "Right Here Waiting" - 4:12	
 "Dance With My Father" - 4:25
 "If Tomorrow Never Comes" - 3:37	
 "Better Be Home Soon" - 3:15
 "Do I Make You Proud" - 4:09	
 "Desperado" - 3:36	
 "Home Coming" - 3:54	
 "For All Your Loved Ones" - 3:36
 "Father And Son" - 2:50	
 "I'll Be There For You" - 3:09
 "Through The Barricades" - 6:16
 "You'll Never Walk Alone" - 2:44

Personnel
 Robin Gibb - vocals
 Trooper Ryan Idzi - vocals
 Sergeant Major Gary Chilton - vocals
 Sergeant Richie Maddocks - vocals
 Toby Champman - synthesisers

Charts

Weekly charts

Year-end charts

Release history

References

2011 albums
The Soldiers albums